Richard Pearsall (29 August 1698 – 10 November 1762) was an English Congregationalist minister and friend of Philip Doddridge.

Life
Born at Kidderminster, Worcestershire, the formative early influences on his religious beliefs were his sisters Hannah and Phoebe. He was later to publish Hannah's diary in 1774 as The Power and Pleasure of Divine Life. Phoebe and Richard were both correspondents of Philip Doddridge; her diary was published by the SPCK. He received his education for the ministry at Tewkesbury, in Gloucestershire, under the famous regime of Samuel Jones, academy tutor. It is not necessarily the case, as stated in some biographies of Pearsall, that he became friends with Thomas Secker and Joseph Butler there, but their careers at the academy almost certainly overlapped, since all three studied there in the late 1710s. 

Pearsall was ordained at Bromyard in Herefordshire in 1721, where he spent ten years of his ministry; from here, he moved to Warminster, in Wiltshire, where he remained for 16 years. His third and most important ministry was at Taunton, in Somerset, where he met opposition to his orthodox Calvinist Trinitarianism. He was minister here for about 15 years, from 1747 to 1762.

Works 
The brevity and uncertainty of life, considered and improved, 1740
The acceptableness of the gospel, 1748
Charge to Mr. Rooker at his Ordination, 1752
Contemplations on the ocean, harvest, sickness, and the last judgment, 1753, 1755, 1760
Early seeking after God opened, and recommended to young ones. In a sermon, 1758
The saint's satisfaction as awakening in God's likeness, 1758
Contemplations on butterflies, 1758
A letter [...] addressed to the Church of Christ, under his pastoral care, 1763
Reliquiae sacrae: or, meditations on select passages of scripture; and sacred dialogues between a father and his children, 1765
Contemplations on the harvest. In four letters, 1787

References 

1698 births
1762 deaths
People from Bromyard
People from Kidderminster
English Congregationalist ministers
18th-century Congregationalist ministers